Barry Matthews (born 2 November 1940) is a former Australian rules footballer who played for the Essendon Football Club in the Victorian Football League (VFL). Matthews won Essendon's reserves best and fairest in 1962. He later played for the Kyneton Football Club and Seaford Football Club.

Notes

External links 
		

Essendon Football Club past player profile

1940 births
Living people
Australian rules footballers from Victoria (Australia)
Essendon Football Club players
Pascoe Vale Football Club players
Kyneton Football Club players